Mu Eridani (μ Eridani) is a binary star system in the constellation Eridanus. It is visible to the naked eye with an apparent visual magnitude of 4.00. Based upon an annual parallax shift of 0.00625 arcseconds, it is located roughly 520 light years from the Sun.

In 1910, this was determined to be a single-lined spectroscopic binary star system. The pair orbit each other with a period of 7.38 days and an eccentricity of 0.344, during which they undergo Algol-like eclipses. The primary is a slowly pulsating B-type star with a stellar classification of  B5 IV. It has a relatively high rate of rotation with a projected rotational velocity of 130 km/s, which is at least 30% of the star's break-up velocity. The star has about six times the Sun's mass and radius, and it shines with 1,905 times the solar luminosity from its outer atmosphere at an effective temperature of 15,668 K.

References

B-type subgiants
Slowly pulsating B stars
Algol variables
Eridanus (constellation)
Eridani, Mu
Eridani, 57
030211
022109
01520
Spectroscopic binaries
Durchmusterung objects